Svitlovodsk Raion was a raion (district) of Kirovohrad Oblast in central Ukraine. The administrative center of the raion was the city of Svitlovodsk, which is incorporated separately as a city of oblast significance and did not belong to the raion. The raion was abolished on 18 July 2020 as part of the administrative reform of Ukraine, which reduced the number of raions of Kirovohrad Oblast to four. The area of Svitlovodsk Raion was merged into Oleksandriia Raion.

At the time of disestablishment, the raion consisted of one hromada, Velyka Andrusivka rural hromada with the administration in the selo of Velyka Andrusivka.

References

Former raions of Kirovohrad Oblast
1962 establishments in Ukraine
Ukrainian raions abolished during the 2020 administrative reform